La Crosse is a town in LaPorte County, Indiana, United States. The population was 551 at the 2010 census. It is included in the Michigan City, Indiana-La Porte, Indiana Metropolitan Statistical Area.

History
La Crosse is derived from the French meaning "the crossing", and it was so named from its location at the junction or crossing of five railroads. The five railroads were:
 Monon Railroad
 Chicago and Indiana Coal Railway (later the Chicago and Eastern Illinois and the Chicago, Attica and Southern)
 Chicago and West Michigan Railway (later the Pere Marquette)
 Pittsburgh, Cincinnati, Chicago and St. Louis Railroad (later the Pennsylvania Railroad)
 Chicago, Cincinnati and Louisville Railroad (later the C&O)

Since 2004, La Crosse has been the headquarters of the Chesapeake and Indiana Railroad, which owns portions of former C&O and Pere Marquette trackage.

The La Crosse post office opened in 1921.

Geography
La Crosse is located at  (41.317924, -86.889831).

Demographics

2010 census
As of the census of 2010, there were 551 people, 227 households, and 157 families living in the town. The racial makeup of the town was 99.5% White, 0.2% African American, and 0.4% from two or more races. Hispanic or Latino of any race were 1.8% of the population.

There were 227 households, of which 29.1% had children under the age of 18 living with them, 52.9% were married couples living together, 9.7% had a female householder with no husband present, 6.6% had a male householder with no wife present, and 30.8% were non-families. 26.0% of all households were made up of individuals, and 11.9% had someone living alone who was 65 years of age or older. The average household size was 2.43 and the average family size was 2.91.

The median age in the town was 36.4 years. 22.7% of residents were under the age of 18; 8.7% were between the ages of 18 and 24; 27.8% were from 25 to 44; 30% were from 45 to 64; and 10.7% were 65 years of age or older. The gender makeup of the town was 49.2% male and 50.8% female.

2000 census
As of the census of 2000, there were 561 people, 221 households, and 152 families living in the town. The racial makeup of the town was 97.86% White, 0.18% African American, 0.36% Native American, 0.53% Asian, 0.18% Pacific Islander, and 0.89% from two or more races. Hispanic or Latino of any race were 2.50% of the population.

There were 221 households, out of which 31.7% had children under the age of 18 living with them, 59.3% were married couples living together, 7.2% had a female householder with no husband present, and 31.2% were non-families. 28.5% of all households were made up of individuals, and 13.1% had someone living alone who was 65 years of age or older. The average household size was 2.54 and the average family size was 3.10.

In the town, the population was spread out, with 26.9% under the age of 18, 7.3% from 18 to 24, 28.9% from 25 to 44, 22.1% from 45 to 64, and 14.8% who were 65 years of age or older. The median age was 37 years. For every 100 females, there were 89.5 males. For every 100 females age 18 and over, there were 86.4 males.

The median income for a household in the town was $36,667, and the median income for a family was $50,278. Males had a median income of $34,583 versus $21,513 for females. The per capita income for the town was $17,962. None of the families and 1.5% of the population were living below the poverty line, including no under eighteens and 2.4% of those over 64.

Education
The town has a lending library, the La Crosse Public Library.

References

External links
 LaCrosse High School Homepage
 LaCrosse Public Library

Towns in LaPorte County, Indiana
Towns in Indiana